Joseph Murray (born 3 January 1987) is a former amateur boxer from Levenshulme, Manchester, England. He is best known for winning a medal at the 2007 World Amateur Boxing Championships at bantamweight and has signed professional terms with Hatton Promotions.  His brother John is the former British Lightweight champion. He got married in Wilmslow Cheshire in March 2014. He is a former pupil of Wright Robinson Sports College in Gorton, Manchester.

Amateur career
Murray, a former roommate of Amir Khan, represented the Moss Side ABC in the British championships semi-finals in 2006 winning a silver medal.

At the World Amateur Boxing Championships in Chicago
Murray defeated Carlos Cuadras, Commonwealth Games silver medallist Mauritian, southpaw, Bruno Julie by 26:19. He lost to Enkhbatyn Badar-Uuganin the semis and won Bronze.

He joined teammates Frankie Gavin and Bradley Saunders in the medal ranks to qualify for the 2008 Summer Olympics in Beijing, China.  Once there however Murray was defeated in the first round of by China's Gu Yu with a score of 17-7. Coach Terry Edwards complained about the scoring of the bout as being "very generous to the chinese" although he admitted that Murray hadn't boxed "his best" and was outboxed

Professional career
Murray started his professional career at Altrincham's Leisure Centre against Sid Razak on 28 March 2009. He won on points in a 6-round contest.

Professional boxing record

References

Living people
1987 births
Boxers from Manchester
English male boxers
People from Levenshulme
Boxers at the 2008 Summer Olympics
Olympic boxers of Great Britain
AIBA World Boxing Championships medalists
Featherweight boxers